Parimal Suklabaidya (born 20 January 1958) is an Indian Politician from the state of Assam. He is a member of the Assam Legislative Assembly from the Bharatiya Janata Party. He became a minister in the Sarbananda Sonowal-led government in 2016. He has been elected for the fourth time from the Dholai constituency.

References

External links 
 

Living people
Bharatiya Janata Party politicians from Assam
State cabinet ministers of Assam
Assam MLAs 2016–2021
Assam MLAs 2021–2026
People from Cachar district
1958 births